The 2022–23 season is the 148th season in the existence of Aston Villa Football Club and the club's fourth consecutive season in the Premier League. In addition to the league, they also competed in the FA Cup and the EFL Cup. The season covers the period from 1 July 2022 to 30 June 2023.

Kits

Players

Current squad
Age at end of season (30 June 2023)

|}

Transfers

In

Out

Loans in

Loans out

Pre-season and mid-season friendlies
In April 2022, Aston Villa announced they would travel to Australia on a pre-season tour to compete in the Queensland Champions Cup, where they faced Leeds United and Brisbane Roar. They also competed in ICON Festival of Football during the stay in Australia where they would come up against Manchester United. On 24 May 2022, Aston Villa announced two further friendlies away at Rennes and the traditional friendly at Walsall. On 10 June, local non-league club Chasetown announced that they would be having a pre-season friendly against a Villa XI. Later friendlies against Leamington and Hednesford Town were announced for those players that did not make the journey to Australia.

On 11 November 2022, Aston Villa announced a friendly had been organised with Villarreal on 15 December, in order to help both teams to prepare for the resumption of the league after the 2022 FIFA World Cup. A "competitive first-team friendly" was also organised between Aston Villa and Cardiff City to help those players who were not going to the World Cup retain their fitness. However, the main purpose of this match was to act as a memorial match for Peter Whittingham, who passed away in 2020 at the age of 35, and who played for both teams. Proceeds from ticket sales for the match were to be donated to charities chosen by Whittingham's family. On 24 November, Villa announced one more friendly, in the United Arab Emirates, against Chelsea for the Al Wahda FC Challenge Cup. On 1 December, Villa announced a further UAE friendly, this one a behind-closed-doors match against Brighton & Hove Albion.

Competitions

Overall record

Premier League

League table

Results summary

Results by round

Matches

The league fixtures were announced on 16 June 2022 at 9am BST.

FA Cup

The Villans joined the competition in the third round and were drawn at home to Stevenage.

EFL Cup

Aston Villa entered the EFL Cup in the second round and were drawn away to Bolton Wanderers.

Squad statistics

Appearances and goals

|-
! colspan=14 style=background:#dcdcdc; text-align:center| Goalkeepers

|-
! colspan=14 style=background:#dcdcdc; text-align:center| Defenders

|-
! colspan=14 style=background:#dcdcdc; text-align:center| Midfielders

 

|-
! colspan=14 style=background:#dcdcdc; text-align:center| Forwards
 

|-
! colspan=14 style=background:#dcdcdc; text-align:center| Players transferred or loaned out during the season

Goals

Assists
Not all goals have an assist.

Clean sheets

Disciplinary record

Club awards

Player of the Month award 
Voted for by fans on Aston Villa's official website.

Goal of the Month award 
Voted for by fans on Aston Villa's Twitter account.

See also
 2022–23 in English football
 List of Aston Villa F.C. seasons

References

Aston Villa
Aston Villa F.C. seasons